Croatia competed at the 2018 Mediterranean Games in Tarragona, Spain from 22 June to 1 July 2018.

Medals by sport

Medalists

References 

Nations at the 2018 Mediterranean Games
2018
2018 in Croatian sport